Maidens' War is a 1985 Czechoslovak play by František Ringo Čech, inspired by the legend of the same name.

Plot 
Prince Přemysl grieves following the death of his wife, Princess Libuše. Vlasta flirted with the prince.

Productions 
Eduard Sedlář directed a production at the Semafor Theatre in Prague, starring Oldřich Navrátil as Prince Přemysl, and also featuring the playwright, František Ringo Čech, in the role of Youngster Ctirad. The play has also been staged at the Theatre Bohemia in Chicago, Illinois.

References

Czech plays
Comedy plays
1985 plays